Lepanthes calodictyon is a small epiphytic orchid native to the montane forest of Ecuador and Colombia, commonly found at elevations ranging from .

References

External links 
 
 

Epiphytic orchids
calodictyon
Orchids of Colombia
Flora of Ecuador